Inverallan is one of the parishes which formed the ecclesiastical (later civil) parish of "Cromdale, Inverallan and Advie" in Morayshire in Scotland.

It is generally equivalent to the area now known as Grantown.

Former church parishes of Scotland
Moray